Domus de Janas (Sardinian: "House of the Fairies" or, alternatively, "House of Witches") are a type of pre-Nuragic rock-cut chamber tomb found in Sardinia. They consist of several chambers quarried out by the people of the San Ciriaco through Ozieri cultures and subsequent cultures, resembling houses in their layout.

Built mostly between 3400 and 2700 BC, they date to the late Neolithic, Chalcolithic and early Bronze Age, including the Bell Beaker period. A necropolis of them at the site of Anghelu Ruju, near Alghero, consists of 38 tombs. Other large sites are those of Montessu, near Villaperuccio, and of Sant'Andrea Priu at Bonorva. Many other domus de janas can be found throughout the island, with the exception of Gallura (where the deceased were usually buried in megalithic circles, such as that those of Li Muri).

The shape of the internal chambers can vary from that of a rounded hut with conical or triangular ceiling. The walls are often decorated with reliefs or etchings depicting magical and religious symbols such as spirals, zig-zag motifs and bull's horns.

Carved or painted false doors appear in about 20 tombs mostly located in northwestern Sardinia, an example being some of the tombs of the necropolis of Anghelu Ruju, which are variously datable from the Ozieri to the Bonnanaro cultures (c.3200 – 1600 BCE). The earliest examples predate the appearance of false doors in Ancient Egyptian tombs. These false doors usually appear on the back wall of the main chamber, and are represented by horizontal and vertical frames and a projecting lintel. Sometimes the door is topped with painted or carved U-shaped bull horns, inscribed inside each other in a variable number.

The corpses, painted with red ochre like the tomb's walls, were buried together with common life objects, jewels and tools. According to archaeologist Giovanni Lilliu, they were buried under shells of molluscs; according to other theories, they were left outside the tomb, being put inside only after they had reduced to a skeleton.

Gallery

See also
 History of Sardinia
 Pre-Nuragic Sardinia
 Necropolis of Santu Pedru
 Hypogeum
 Enchanted Moura

References

Domus de Janas on the Atlas Obscura.

Bibliography
 Giovanni Lilliu, La civiltà dei Sardi dal neolitico all'età dei nuraghi, Torino, Edizioni ERI, 1967
 AA.VV. La civiltà in Sardegna nei secoli, Torino, Edizioni ERI
 AA.VV., Ichnussa. Sardegna dalle origini all'età classica, Milano, 1981 
 Alberto Moravetti, Guide archeologiche Sardegna 2, 1995

Burial monuments and structures
Archaeology of death
Archaeological sites in Sardinia